The 1974–75 daytime network television schedule for the three major English-language commercial broadcast networks in the United States covers the weekday and weekend daytime hours from September 1974 to August 1975.

Talk shows are highlighted in  yellow, local programming is white, reruns of older programming are orange, game shows are pink, soap operas are chartreuse, news programs are gold, children's programs are light purple and sports programs are light blue. New series are highlighted in bold.

PBS, the Public Broadcasting Service, was in operation, but the schedule was set by each local station.

Monday-Friday

Notes
ABC had a 6PM (ET)/5PM (CT) feed for their newscast, depending on stations' schedule.

Saturday

Sunday

By network

ABC

Returning Series
The $10,000 Pyramid 
ABC Evening News
All My Children
American Bandstand
The Brady Bunch 
The Bugs Bunny Show
General Hospital
The Girl in My Life
Goober and the Ghost Chasers 
Issues and Answers
Lassie's Rescue Rangers 
Let's Make a Deal
Make a Wish
The Newlywed Game
One Life to Live
Password
Schoolhouse Rock!
Split Second
Super Friends 
Yogi's Gang 

New Series
AM America
The Big Showdown
Blankety Blanks
Devlin
Hong Kong Phooey
Korg: 70,000 B.C.
The Money Maze
The New Adventures of Gilligan
Rhyme and Reason
Ryan's Hope
Showoffs
These Are the Days
You Don't Say!

Not Returning From 1973-74
The ABC Saturday Superstar Movie
The Brady Kids
H.R. Pufnstuf 
Kid Power 
Love, American Style 
Mission: Magic!
The Osmonds

CBS

Returning Series
As the World Turns
Bailey's Comets 
Camera Three
Captain Kangaroo
CBS Children's Film Festival
CBS Evening News
CBS Morning News
The Edge of Night
Face the Nation
Fat Albert and the Cosby Kids
Gambit
The Guiding Light
Jeannie 
The Joker's Wild
Lamp Unto My Feet
Look Up and Live
Love of Life
Match Game
My Favorite Martians 
Now You See It
The Pebbles and Bamm-Bamm Show 
The Price Is Right
Scooby-Doo, Where Are You! 
Search for Tomorrow
Speed Buggy 
Sunrise Semester
Tattletales
The Young and the Restless

New Series
The Harlem Globetrotters Popcorn Machine
The Hudson Brothers Razzle Dazzle Show
Musical Chairs
Partridge Family 2200 A.D.
Shazam!
Spin-Off
The U.S. of Archie
Valley of the Dinosaurs

Not Returning From 1973-74
The $10,000 Pyramid (moved to ABC)
The Amazing Chan and the Chan Clan 
Everything's Archie
The Flintstones Comedy Show 
Help!... It's the Hair Bear Bunch! 
Josie and the Pussycats 
The New Scooby-Doo Movies
Sabrina the Teenage Witch 
The Secret Storm

NBC

Returning Series
The Addams Family 
Another World
Celebrity Sweepstakes
Days of Our Lives
The Doctors
Emergency +4
Go!
High Rollers
The Hollywood Squares
How to Survive a Marriage
Jackpot
Jeopardy!
The Jetsons 
Meet the Press
Name That Tune
NBC Nightly News
NBC Saturday Night News
NBC Sunday Night News
The New Pink Panther Show
Sigmund and the Sea Monsters
Somerset
Star Trek: The Animated Series
Today
Winning Streak

New Series
Blank Check
Land of the Lost
The Magnificent Marble Machine
Run, Joe, Run
Wheel of Fortune
Wheelie and the Chopper Bunch

Not Returning From 1973-74
Baffle
Butch Cassidy and the Sundance Kids
Dinah's Place
Inch High, Private Eye
Lidsville 
Return to Peyton Place
Three on a Match
The Who, What, or Where Game
The Wizard of Odds

See also
1974-75 United States network television schedule (prime-time)
1974-75 United States network television schedule (late night)

United States weekday network television schedules
1974 in American television
1975 in American television